This page shows the results of the Men's Wrestling Competition at the 1975 Pan American Games, held from October 12 to October 26, 1971, in Mexico City, Mexico.

Men's Freestyle

Freestyle (– 48 kg)

Freestyle (– 52 kg)

Freestyle (– 57 kg)

Freestyle (– 62 kg)

Freestyle (– 68 kg)

Freestyle (– 74 kg)

Freestyle (– 82 kg)

Freestyle (– 90 kg)

Freestyle (– 100 kg)

Freestyle (+ 100 kg)

Men's Greco-Roman

Greco-Roman (– 48 kg)

Greco-Roman (– 52 kg)

Greco-Roman (– 57 kg)

Greco-Roman (– 62 kg)

Greco-Roman (– 68 kg)

Greco-Roman (– 74 kg)

Greco-Roman (– 82 kg)

Greco-Roman (– 90 kg)

Greco-Roman (– 100 kg)

Greco-Roman (+ 100 kg)

Medal table

See also
Wrestling at the 1976 Summer Olympics

References
 Sports 123

1975 Pan American Games
P
1975
International wrestling competitions hosted by Mexico